Anthony Neil James Pilkington (born 6 June 1988) is an Irish former professional footballer who played as a winger.

After playing non-league football briefly, he began his professional career with spells at Stockport County and Huddersfield Town. In July 2011, he joined Premier League side Norwich City in a deal worth up to £3 million and went on to play 75 matches in the top tier for the Canaries before moving to Cardiff City three years later. He also represented Republic of Ireland at international level winning nine caps.

Club career

Stockport County
Born in Blackburn, Lancashire, Pilkington spent time with the youth systems of Preston North End, Manchester United and hometown club Blackburn Rovers. He joined Stockport County on 15 December 2006, from Atherton Collieries, where he made his name scoring a hat-trick against F.C. United of Manchester and signed initially on a short-term contract at Edgeley Park, and made an instant impact on the team, scoring three goals in his first four games for the club, including two against Shrewsbury Town at Gay Meadow. Pilkington then played a big part in County's record breaking run of results during January and February 2007.

He continued to help Stockport's push for the playoffs by scoring a further two goals in a season which saw County miss out on the play-offs only on goal-difference.

The following season he scored the second goal for Stockport and assisted the third in their 3–2 win over Rochdale at Wembley Stadium. He also picked up the official man-of-the-match award as Stockport were promoted to League One.

In January 2008, his brother Danny also signed for Stockport.

Huddersfield Town
On 23 January 2009, he was signed by fellow League One side Huddersfield Town on a three-and-a-half-year contract. He made his debut in the 1–0 defeat by Yeovil Town at Huish Park on 27 January 2009. On 3 March, he scored his first league goal for Huddersfield against Colchester United at the Galpharm Stadium. The match ended 2–2. His first away goal for the Terriers came in the 2–1 win against Bristol Rovers at the Memorial Stadium on 31 March 2009.

Pilkington started the 2009–10 season well, scoring on the opening day of the season against Southend United when Huddersfield were two goals down to make it 2–1, they eventually drew the game 2–2. He then scored two more in the second round of the Football League Trophy in a 3–3 draw with Chesterfield, eventually losing on penalties. His second league goal came in a 2–1 away loss at Charlton Athletic with a 30-yard free kick just before half time.

Pilkington was a regular in the Huddersfield team throughout the 2009–10 season, only missing one league game all season. He made 45 league appearances with a further five coming in cup competitions, scoring seven league goals as Huddersfield made a play-off semi-final, with a further two goals coming in the Football League Trophy.

In the 2–1 home win over Rochdale, on 8 March 2011, Pilkington suffered a dislocated left ankle as well as a break to the fibula bone above the ankle. On 30 June, the club announced that Pilkington had declared his intention to leave following their failure to win promotion from League One.

Norwich City

Pilkington joined Norwich City on 6 July 2011 and signed a three-year deal with the option of a further 12 months. The fee was reported to be around £2 million but rising to £3 million with add-ons.

He made his first appearance since his injury in the 1–1 friendly draw versus Real Zaragoza on 3 August 2011, coming off the bench to replace Bradley Johnson. Pilkington made his competitive Norwich debut in the opening day Premier League 1–1 draw at Wigan Athletic, replacing Steve Morison. Pilkington's first Norwich goal came on 17 September 2011, in a 2–1 win against Bolton Wanderers at the Reebok Stadium. Pilkington scored a double in the 3–1 win over Swansea City at Carrow Road on 15 October 2011. He scored his eighth goal of his first Premier League campaign in a 2–1 away win over Tottenham Hotspur on 9 April 2012.

On 17 November 2012, Pilkington scored the winning goal against his former club Manchester United in a 1–0 win for Norwich.

Cardiff City
On 14 August 2014, it was reported that Norwich had agreed a £1m fee with Cardiff City for Pilkington. The move was completed on 15 August with Pilkington signing a three-year deal.
His first goal for Cardiff City came during their 2–1 win against Sheffield Wednesday on 27 September 2014. He became a regular in the starting eleven until a hamstring injury put him out for several months on 29 November. He made his return in April in a 3–1 loss at Ipswich Town.

Pilkington returned to the starting line up, the following season, eventually scoring his first goal against Huddersfield Town in September. Following with consecutive goals against Bolton Wanderers and Sheffield Wednesday. With the club short on forwards following departures in the January transfer window, Pilkington was moved into an unfamiliar more advanced role playing as a striker and finished the season with nine goals in total, including braces against Rotherham United and Preston North End, finishing the season as the club's top scorer.

Pilkington opened his accounts for the new season, against Fulham in a 2–2 draw before scoring a brace against former club, Norwich City. On 27 September, he was rewarded with a two-year contract extension, keeping him at Cardiff until 2019. Despite finishing as one of the club's top goalscorer during the season, with 8 goals, he only managed 7 appearances following Neil Warnock's arrival in October, leading to the manager claiming he didn't know whether Pilkington had a future at the club.

Despite the uncertainty of his future, Pilkington stayed at the club during the summer of 2017, making appearances in the EFL Cup and scoring against Burton Albion. He made his first league appearance on 16 December, starting in a 1–0 win over Hull City, due to the club being left without a recognised striker. Pilkington managed to find the net in a 4–0 win over Sunderland and in a FA Cup at Mansfield Town. His return to the first team led to Warnock stating that there could still be a future for the striker, despite offers during the January transfer window.

Wigan Athletic
On 10 January 2019, Pilkington was signed by Wigan Athletic on a free transfer after leaving Cardiff via mutual consent, signing an 18-month deal. He started their next game, which was a 3–0 win against Aston Villa. He played ten games. for Wigan, in 2018–19. He did not score in that season. The next season, he became a rotation player for Wigan. He scored his first goal in a 1–0 win against Birmingham City. For the 2019–20 season, he played 16 times and scored on three occasions, including his former club, Huddersfield.

East Bengal 
On 17 October 2020, Pilkington moved to Indian Super League and signed with SC East Bengal, managed by Robbie Fowler. He scored first league goal against Odisha FC in 3–1 win on 3 January 2021. He appeared in seventeen matches with the Red and Gold brigade, scoring three times as they finished on ninth position.

Fleetwood Town 
Pilkington left East Bengal at the end of the 2020–21 season because he had agreed terms with League One side, Fleetwood Town. He started the season in a 1–0 defeat to Portsmouth. He played in ten league games for The Cod Army as well as two other games. He scored his first goal for Fleetwood in a 1–0 win against Rotherham in January 2022. Pilkington was released by the club at the end of the 2021–22 season.

Retirement
On 19 October 2022, Pilkington announced his retirement from football having been without a club since his release from Fleetwood five months prior.

International career
Pilkington received a call-up to the Republic of Ireland under-21 squad in October 2008; not knowing he was eligible to play for Republic of Ireland national sides until a scout enquired of his availability. He qualifies through his paternal grandmother from Dublin. He played in the 3–0 away victory over Lithuania, where he impressed and even hit the woodwork. Giovanni Trapattoni and Marco Tardelli were reported to have been keeping an eye on him ahead of Ireland's participation in UEFA Euro 2012. In January 2013, Pilkington was called up for the Republic of Ireland Senior Team to play Poland in a friendly in February. The Norwich winger played almost 20 minutes during Ireland's 2–1 loss to Sweden in Dublin on 6 September 2013 as a replacement for James McClean in a 2014 FIFA World Cup qualification (UEFA) game.

On 18 November 2014, Pilkington scored his first goal for Ireland against the U.S.A with a sublime chip over the keeper.

Personal life
Pilkington has a younger brother, Danny, who plays for Stalybridge Celtic.

Career statistics

Club

International
Scores and results list the Republic of Ireland's goal tally first, score column indicates score after each Pilkington goal.

Honours
Stockport County
Football League Two play-offs: 2008

Cardiff City
EFL Championship runner-up: 2017–18

Individual
PFA Team of the Year: 2010–11 League One

See also
 List of Republic of Ireland international footballers born outside the Republic of Ireland

References

External links

1988 births
Living people
Footballers from Blackburn
English footballers
English people of Irish descent
Republic of Ireland association footballers
Republic of Ireland under-21 international footballers
Republic of Ireland international footballers
Association football wingers
Association football forwards
Association football utility players
Atherton Collieries A.F.C. players
Stockport County F.C. players
Huddersfield Town A.F.C. players
Norwich City F.C. players
Cardiff City F.C. players
Wigan Athletic F.C. players
East Bengal Club players
Fleetwood Town F.C. players
Premier League players
English Football League players
Expatriate footballers in India
Irish expatriate sportspeople in India